Sazaa is a 1951 Indian Hindi-language film directed by Fali Mistry. The film stars Dev Anand, Nimmi and Shyama.

Plot 
A woman, Kamini (Shyama) starts shrieking from atop a bungalow. Ashok (Dev Anand) hurriedly descends an angular staircase, and then runs into a street where he meets with an accident. Kamini rushes him to a hospital. He then takes a long time to recuperate. Kamini visits Ashok daily without fail and after he recovers, Kamini offers him a manager's job at her father Muthumal's (Gope) company and arranges for him to meet Mothumal over dinner. At Kamini's house, Ashok meets and falls in love with the maidservant Asha (Nimmi) who also happens to be his childhood mate. In due course, Asha reciprocates his feelings.

In reality, Ashok is the only son of a wealthy widower, Major Durjan (K. N. Singh), who gets him locked in a room with the instruction “to cremate him if he died of suffocation” after a chance discovery of another character, Rani Ma (Durga Khote), a look-alike of his deceased wife. Rani Ma is angry at Ashok, as her only daughter was abandoned by him on the night of their marriage, leading to her having gone mad. Durjan defies Rani Ma and decides to get Ashok married to Asha. The couple unite.

Cast 
Dev Anand as Ashok
Nimmi as Asha
Shyama as Kamini
K. N. Singh as Major Durjan
Durga Khote as Rani Maa
Lalita Pawar as Asha's Mother
Mukri as Batwa
Gope as Muthumal

Soundtrack 

The music was composed by S. D. Burman, while Sahir Ludhianvi wrote the lyrics for the songs. On the album, film critic Suresh Kohli of The Hindu noted that all the songs "have thoughtful lyrics that provide a sense of permanency through S.D. Burman's immortal compositions."

Reception 
Kohli wrote, "Given the limited scope of the script, the cast performs well with the dreamy-eyed Nimmi particularly excelling".

References

External links 
 
 Sazaa (1951 film) at Bollywood Hungama
 Sazaa Full Film on YouTube

1951 films
1950s Hindi-language films
Indian black-and-white films
Indian musical drama films
1950s musical drama films
Films scored by S. D. Burman
Films directed by Fali Mistry